

Players

Seeds
The top two seeds received a bye into the second round.

Qualifiers
  Marco Chiudinelli
  Antonio Veić
  Lukáš Rosol
  Thomas Schoorel

Draw

First qualifier

Second qualifier

Third qualifier

Fourth qualifier

References
Qualifying Draw

2011 Qatar Open